Phi Alpha Gamma is a professional fraternity founded at the New York Homeopathic Medical College, March 25, 1894, by Thomas D. Buchanan, Thomas F. Davies, Edmund M. De Vol, Robert M. Jones, Brooks DeF. Worwood, Arthur B. Smith and Harry S. Willard. Beta chapter was founded at the Boston University School of Medicine, November 26, 1896. In January, delegates from these chapters met delegates from a similar society called KT, which had been established the month before at the Hahnemann Medical College of Philadelphia, and the societies were joined under the name of ΦΑΓ. The Minnesota and Iowa chapters were formed from the two chapters of a fraternity called ΠΚΤ, established with the view of confining it to homeopathic schools of medicine.

ΦΑΓ had active chapters in New York (Alpha) and Philadelphia (Gamma) in 1947.  Preliminary details of amalgamation between Phi Alpha Gamma and Phi Chi Medical Fraternity had been worked out by Dr. Albert Saunders of Phi Chi and these the Phi Chi National Convention of 1947 approved with instructions to the Executive Trustees to complete the merger.

The Phi Alpha Gamma merger was completed on February 21, 1948, when Phi Alpha of Phi Chi at New York Medical College and Phi Alpha Gamma at Hahnemann Medical College in Philadelphia were installed.  At the annual Founders' Day Banquet of the Phi Chi Alumni Association in New York, with members from Alpha Mu, Rho Delta and Upsilon sigma attending, 48 charter members of Phi Alpha were initiated by Dr. Jacob E. Reisch.  At that same time, seven members of the then existing Gamma chapter of Phi Alpha Gamma traveled to New York to be initiated into Phi Chi.  This event ceremonially completed the merger of Phi Alpha Gamma and Phi Chi, which had been agreed upon by the official bodies of each Fraternity.

The ΦΑΓ Fraternity consisted of the following chapters before merging with ΦΧ:

The Phi Alpha Gamma Quarterly- annual publication begun in 1902

The badge of the fraternity is a middle phalanx of the little finger of a human hand, mounted in gold, with the letters ΦΑΓ in gold upon a field of black enamel. The color of the fraternity is violet, and its flower is the violet.

Other professional medical fraternities
In addition to the medical fraternities listed here, there are numerous chiropractic, pre-health, pharmacy and nursing fraternities.
 Alpha Delta Theta, medical technology
 Alpha Gamma Kappa
 Alpha Kappa Kappa
 Alpha Phi Sigma, see Phi Delta Epsilon 
 Alpha Tau Sigma, Osteopathic, dormant
 Mu Sigma Phi, Philippines
 Nu Sigma Nu
 Omega Tau Sigma, veterinary medicine
 Omega Upsilon Phi, see Phi Beta Pi
 Phi Beta Pi
 Phi Chi
 Phi Delta Epsilon
 Phi Kappa Mu, Philippines
 Phi Lambda Kappa
 Phi Rho Sigma
 Sigma Mu Delta, pre-medical
 Theta Kappa Psi

References

External link 
 Phi Chi Medical Fraternity, Inc. National Page

Phi Chi
Professional medical fraternities and sororities in the United States
Defunct fraternities and sororities
1894 establishments in New York (state)
Student organizations established in 1894